Porters Sideling is an unincorporated community located in Heidelberg Township in York County, Pennsylvania, United States. Porters Sideling is located about a mile southeast off Pennsylvania Route 116 and is about 8 miles away from Codorus State Park.

References

http://www.usgwarchives.org/maps/pa/county/york/usgs

Unincorporated communities in York County, Pennsylvania
Unincorporated communities in Pennsylvania